Mayiladuthurai–Coimbatore Jan Shatabdi Express is a Jan Shatabdi Express train connecting  and  in Tamil Nadu, India. The passenger service is one among the twenty Jan Shatabdi Express trains in India other than Chennai Central–Vijayawada Jan Shatabdi Express that runs within Tamil Nadu.

Overview 
Apart from the Chennai Central–Vijayawada Jan Shatabdi Express running within Tamil Nadu, this service is one among twenty Jan Shatabdi Express trains in India.

Service 
During June 2004, the Southern Railway zone announced that the service would run until 15 July 2004. As the service initially received poor patronage the railways were forced to operate the service in reverse direction viz. Coimbatore–Thanjavur expecting a better response. During Railway Budget 2005–2006, Lalu Prasad Yadav, the then Minister of Railways announced the extension of service up to  pending gauge conversion. The service initially numbered as 20832084 was changed to 1208312084 since December 2010 onwards as a part of train management system over the entire Indian Railways network.

Rakes 
The service initially had twelve bogies of Open coach type including couple of air-conditioned chair car coaches, which was reduced due to poor patronage towards June 2003, bringing down the number of rakes to seven including one air-conditioned chair car coach during the period of extension in continuation of its service. During July 2011, one more bogie of Second Seating type was permanently augmented. Later it had 13 bogies all composing a single Air-conditioned Chair Car (CC), Ten Second Seating (2S) and Two luggage-cum-break van chair car coaches (SL1 & SL2). During December 2016, the service was permanently augmented by an additional air-conditioned chair car for both directions consolidating a total of two air-conditioned chair car coaches.

Route 
The service follows the same route and pattern during the return journey too.

Developments 
Thus becoming the first train in Southern Railway zone and South India as well to be fully operated with solar powered coaches.

See also 
Chennai Central Vijayawada Jan Shatabdi Express
Raigarh Gondia Jan Shatabdi Express

Notes

References

External links 

Jan Shatabdi Express trains
Rail transport in Tamil Nadu
Railway services introduced in 2003
Transport in Coimbatore